Piya Sorcar (born 1977) is an American social entrepreneur and researcher. She is the founder and CEO of TeachAids, and is a lecturer at Stanford University.

Background
Sorcar was born in Colorado, the eldest daughter of artist and engineer Manick Sorcar and Shikha Sorcar, and the granddaughter of the pre-eminent magician P. C. Sorcar and Basanti Devi. As a child actor, she was nominated for a regional Emmy Award for her performance in the short film Deepa & Rupa: A Fairy Tale from India, directed by her father, which went on to win at the Chicago International Film Festival.

Career

She began the development of TeachAids at Stanford, where it was the focus of her doctoral research. In 2009, she founded it as a nonprofit partnered with the university. She was quoted saying that "Working with a team of interdisciplinary experts at Stanford University, I conducted extensive research over 5+ years to develop an innovative approach to teaching about HIV education which would bypass taboos and maximize learning and retention."This included using 2D cartoon images (which balance clarity and comfort), a rigorous, research-based translation/back-translation process, incorporation of mnemonic devices, and integration of recognized voices of regionally-specific cultural icons, among other discoveries.
She has led TeachAIDS to produce many versions of its interactive HIV prevention software, which are now used in more than 80 countries. Her work has included directing Bollywood actors Amitabh Bachchan, Shabana Azmi, Shruti Haasan, Amol Palekar, Imran Khan, and Nagarjuna.

Sorcar teaches at the Stanford University School of Medicine, on the design of research-based global health interventions.

In 2011, MIT Technology Review named her to their TR35 list of the top 35 most innovative people in the world under 35.  In 2012, she and TeachAids were named one of 12 global laureates of The Tech Awards.

References

American film producers
Stanford University alumni
University of Colorado Boulder alumni
Bengali Hindus
Living people
1977 births
Piya
Date of birth missing (living people)
Place of birth missing (living people)
Film directors from Colorado
Filmmakers from California
American social entrepreneurs